The Frank Spencer Holiday Classic is a nationally recognized basketball tournament held in Winston-Salem, North Carolina in late December. The tournament is named after Frank Spencer, former sports editor for the Winston-Salem Journal, and is a significant fundraiser for the high schools of Winston-Salem/Forsyth County Schools.

History
As a result of Spencer's relentless campaign throughout the state of North Carolina, 11 high schools built gymnasiums in the 1930s and 1940s that included basketball courts. His dream come true was the formation of the Northwest (NC) Basketball Tournament which he ran from the 1920s through the early 1950s.  The tournament eventually had more than 140 teams and lasted nearly four weeks. "Ripley's Believe It or Not" recognized the tournament as the world's largest sports tournament.

After a 20-year hiatus, the tournament was revived in 1974 and was formatted to a smaller three-day even held each December between Christmas and New Year's at Winston-Salem Memorial Coliseum, and upon its demolition, the newly built Lawrence Joel Veterans Memorial Coliseum.

High school participants of past Frank Spencer tournaments who went on to play professional basketball include NBA players Chris Paul, Josh Howard and Othello Hunter, as well as professional players in non-U.S. leagues including Reyshawn Terry.

The 2011 tournament produced some firsts.  In the Pepsi Bracket, Forsyth Country Day became the first private school to win a Frank Spencer Championship.  The Furies defeated West Forsyth for the title in overtime.  That game also marked the first championship game to be decided in overtime.

In the Champion Bracket, West Stokes became the first 2A school to win the Frank Spencer Championship.  The Wildcats defeated Winston-Salem Prep in triple-overtime.  The game is also the longest game in tournament history.

Past Champions
 
2021 Glenn (Pepsi Bracket)
2021 Winston-Salem Prep (WSFCS Bracket)
2020 No Tournament Held
2019 Mt. Tabor (Pepsi Bracket)
2019 North Forsyth (Wake Forest Baptist Sports Bracket)
2018 East Forsyth (Pepsi Bracket)
2018 Parkland (Myers Tire Bracket)
2017 RJ Reynolds (Pepsi Bracket)
2017 Winston-Salem Prep (Champion Bracket)
2016  West Forsyth  (Champion Bracket)
2016  Mt. Airy (Pepsi Bracket)2015  RJ Reynolds (Champion Bracket)
2015  Parkland (Pepsi Bracket)2014  Reagan (Champion Bracket)
2014  East Forsyth (Pepsi Bracket)
2013  East Forsyth (Champion Bracket)
2013  West Stokes (Pepsi Bracket)
2012  Mt. Tabor (Champion Bracket)
2012  Forsyth Country Day (Pepsi Bracket)
2011  West Stokes (Champion Bracket)
2011  Forsyth Country Day (Pepsi Bracket)
2010  Lexington (Journal Bracket)
2010  Reagan (Pepsi Bracket)
2009  Reagan
2008  Mt. Tabor
2007  Mt. Tabor
2006  (National) Kathleen HS (Kathleen, Fla.)
2006  (Local) East Forsyth
2005  (National) South Laurel HS (South Laurel, Ky.)
2005  (Local)Mt. Tabor
2004  (National) Gaffney HS (Gaffney, S.C.)
2004  (Local) Parkland
2003  West Forsyth
2002  West Forsyth
2001  North Forsyth
2000  R.J. Reynolds
1999  R.J. Reynolds
1998  R.J. Reynolds
1997  Mt. Tabor
1996  Carver
1995  West Forsyth
1994  Glenn
1993  Parkland
1992  East Forsyth
1991  Carver
1990  Carver
1989  North Forsyth
1988  Eden Morehead
1987  Glenn
1986  North Forsyth
1985  North Surry
1984  North Forsyth
1983  Chapel Hill
1982  North Surry
1981  Hickory
1980  Parkland
1979  West Forsyth
1978  North Forsyth
1977  East Forsyth
1976  North Forsyth
1975  No Tournament Held
1974  R.J. Reynolds

Tournament Championships

References

External links
Frank Spencer Holiday Classic
Frank Spencer Holiday Classic 2010 Schedule
Frank Spencer Holiday Classic 2011 Schedule

Economy of Winston-Salem, North Carolina
Sports in Winston-Salem, North Carolina
High school basketball competitions in the United States
Basketball in North Carolina
1974 establishments in North Carolina
Recurring sporting events established in 1974